Long Tom is a generic name for some early age cannon and field guns, used both on land as at sea.

More specifically it was used for :
 155 mm Long Tom, a U.S. World War II era field gun
 155 mm Creusot Long Tom, a Boer War field gun
 64-pounder Long Tom, a U.S. Civil War cannon
 42-pounder Long Tom, as found on the General Armstrong (1812)
 24-or 32-pound "Long Tom" cannon, as found on the American  or Spanish Guerrero
 18-pound Long Tom, as found on the American privateer Decatur

Field artillery